Barlow Clowes International Ltd v Eurotrust International Ltd [2005] UKPC 37 is an English trusts law case, concerning breach of trust and liability for dishonest assistance.

Facts
Barlow Clowes International Ltd was in liquidation, after its fraudulent securities scheme was exposed. It took £140m of investors’ money, and paid it into an Isle of Man company where Mr Henwood was a director. The liquidator of Barlow Clowes argued that Mr Henwood had dishonestly assisted the dissipation of the investors’ money.

The deemster (judge on the Isle of Man) held that Mr Henwood was dishonest. The Court of Appeal held that Mr Henwood was not dishonest, and there was no evidence by which the deemster could have found this. Her disbelief at Mr Henwood’s oral testimony and her inferences were not enough.

Advice
Lord Hoffmann held Mr Henwood was liable, and the deemster had correctly applied the principles of liability for dishonest assistance. She had stated that Mr Henwood suspected the funds were misappropriated money, and (disapproving Brinks Ltd v Abu-Saleh (No 3) [1996] CLC 133) a person could know and suspect money was being misappropriated and thus be liable without knowing the money was held on trust or even knowing what a trust meant. The findings of fact could be made legitimately. With later transactions he had been informed that the director of Barlow Clowes was misappropriating clients’ money, and no inquiries were made. He held there was an element of ambiguity in Lord Hutton’s decision in Twinsectra Ltd v Yardley. When it was said that ‘what he knows would offend normally accepted standards of honest conduct’ means that what he knows was in objective fact dishonest.

Lord Nicholls, Lord Steyn gave concurring judgments.

Lord Walker and Lord Carswell concurred.

See also

English trusts law

Notes

References

English trusts case law
Judicial Committee of the Privy Council cases on appeal from the Isle of Man
2005 in the Isle of Man
2005 in British law
2005 in case law